Penjuku is a coastal village on the island Nggatokae of the New Georgia Group in Western Province, Solomon Islands. The estimated terrain elevation above sea level is some 7 meters.

References

Islands of the Solomon Islands
Polynesian outliers